Birendra Narayan Chakraborty   (also Birendra Narayan Chakravarty) (20 December 1904 – 26 March 1976) was an Indian civil servant, politician and the second governor of Haryana.

He attended Kolkata's Scottish Church College, and continued his education at the University of Calcutta. He joined University College London for a BSc in chemistry in 1926. After further studies for the Indian Civil Service examinations at the School of Oriental Studies, London, he passed the examinations in 1928 and joined the ICS in October 1929 as an assistant collector and magistrate in the Bengal Presidency. He was promoted to joint magistrate and deputy collector in July 1930 and to additional district and sessions judge (officiating) in June 1935. In February 1936, he was promoted to full magistrate and collector, and was appointed a joint secretary with the Finance Department of the Government of Bengal in April 1944. As an acting secretary, he was appointed an Officer of the Order of the British Empire (OBE) in the 1945 Birthday Honours list.

After Indian independence, he served in many government posts. He was Indian Ambassador of Netherlands from 1952 - 1954 and high commissioner for India to the United Kingdom and Canada. Later he served as Governor of Haryana from 15 September 1967 until his death in office on 26 March 1976, aged 71.

References

External links
Reference to the "late B.N. Chakraborty"

Scottish Church College alumni
University of Calcutta alumni
Alumni of the University of London
Alumni of University College London
Governors of Haryana
Indian civil servants
Indian Civil Service (British India) officers
Indian Officers of the Order of the British Empire
1904 births
1976 deaths
Ambassadors of India to the Netherlands